Keiko Inoue may refer to:

Keiko Toda, actress
Keiko Onuki, Battle Royale character